Hollo may refer to:
 Anselm Hollo (1934–2013), Finnish poet and translator
 Juho Aukusti Hollo (1885–1967), Finnish translator
 Tibor Hollo (born 1927), American real estate developer 
 Hollo, Pennsylvania, an unincorporated community in the United States

See also 
 Iso-Hollo
 

Finnish-language surnames